Rogachevo is the name of several rural localities in Russia:
Rogachevo, Arkhangelsk Oblast, a settlement in Novaya Zemlya District of Arkhangelsk Oblast
Rogachevo, Ivanovo Oblast, a village in Privolzhsky District of Ivanovo Oblast
Rogachevo, Kaliningrad Oblast, a settlement in Kovrovsky Rural Okrug of Zelenogradsky District of Kaliningrad Oblast
Rogachevo, Kaluga Oblast, a village in Borovsky District of Kaluga Oblast
Rogachevo, Kostroma Oblast, a village in Orekhovskoye Settlement of Galichsky District of Kostroma Oblast
Rogachevo, Dmitrovsky District, Moscow Oblast, a selo in Bolsherogachevskoye Rural Settlement of Dmitrovsky District of Moscow Oblast
Rogachevo, Borisovskoye Rural Settlement, Mozhaysky District, Moscow Oblast, a village in Borisovskoye Rural Settlement of Mozhaysky District of Moscow Oblast
Rogachevo, Poretskoye Rural Settlement, Mozhaysky District, Moscow Oblast, a village in Poretskoye Rural Settlement of Mozhaysky District of Moscow Oblast
Rogachevo, Ramensky District, Moscow Oblast, a village in Ganusovskoye Rural Settlement of Ramensky District of Moscow Oblast
Rogachevo, Sergiyevo-Posadsky District, Moscow Oblast, a village under the administrative jurisdiction of the Town of Krasnozavodsk in Sergiyevo-Posadsky District, Moscow Oblast
Rogachevo, Gdovsky District, Pskov Oblast, a village in Gdovsky District, Pskov Oblast
Rogachevo, Nevelsky District, Pskov Oblast, a village in Nevelsky District, Pskov Oblast
Rogachevo, Novosokolnichesky District, Pskov Oblast, a village in Novosokolnichesky District, Pskov Oblast
Rogachevo, Porkhovsky District, Pskov Oblast, a village in Porkhovsky District, Pskov Oblast
Rogachevo, Korokhotkinskoye Rural Settlement, Smolensky District, Smolensk Oblast, a village in Korokhotkinskoye Rural Settlement of Smolensky District of Smolensk Oblast
Rogachevo, Kozinskoye Rural Settlement, Smolensky District, Smolensk Oblast, a village in Kozinskoye Rural Settlement of Smolensky District of Smolensk Oblast
Rogachevo, Rzhevsky District, Tver Oblast, a village in Rzhevsky District, Tver Oblast
Rogachevo, Vyshnevolotsky District, Tver Oblast, a village in Vyshnevolotsky District, Tver Oblast
Rogachevo, Vologda Oblast, a village in Markovsky Selsoviet of Vologodsky District of Vologda Oblast